Korle Gonno is a town in the Greater Accra Region of Ghana. The town is known for the Saint Mary's Secondary.  The school is a second cycle institution.
The Korle-Bu Teaching Hospital is located in Korle Gonno.

References

Populated places in the Greater Accra Region